Williamstown Pier was the original terminus of the Williamstown railway line, on the Melbourne suburban rail system. It was in the suburb of Williamstown, to the west of central Melbourne. The station existed primarily to serve the Williamstown docks precinct.

Originally named Pier, it opened on 17 January 1859. It opened to passengers on 15 May 1881, and relocated to a new site on 8 January 1905.

The station contained a goods yard that was used for grain shipments, up until the 1960s.

By mid-1978, the station building was demolished and was replaced with two smaller brick structures. The last services terminated at the station on 25 March 1987, following a derailment on the sharply curved track leading to the station. All rails, sleepers, overhead wires and signals were removed by October 1988, with the platform track currently ending just under the Ann Street footbridge, at the Down end of Williamstown station. The station was subsequently demolished, and replaced with a car park.

References

Disused railway stations in Melbourne
Railway stations in Australia opened in 1905
Railway stations closed in 1987
1987 disestablishments in Australia
Williamstown, Victoria